Mikayil Chingiz oghlu Jabbarov ( born 19 September 1976) is the current Minister of Economу of the Republic of Azerbaijan (since 23 October 2019), Minister of Taxes of the Republic of Azerbaijan (2017–2019), Minister of Education of the Republic of Azerbaijan (2013–2017), Director of the Administration of Icherisheher State Historical-Architectural Reserve under the Cabinet of Ministers of the Republic of Azerbaijan (2009–2013), Deputy Minister of Economic Development of the Republic of Azerbaijan (2004–2009). President of the Azerbaijan Badminton Federation (2015–2021), President of the Azerbaijan Fencing Federation (2017–2021), President of Azerbaijan Wrestling Federation (since 2021).

Life

Mikayil Jabbarov was born on 19 September 1976 in Baku.

Education

1992–1997 – Studied at Baku State University, graduated from the International Law Department with distinction.

1997–1998 – Obtained an LL.M degree from McGeorge School of Law, University of the Pacific (Sacramento, California, US).

2004 – Obtained a master's degree in Economics from Azerbaijan State Economic University.

Career

In 1995, Jabbarov began his professional career in the finance industry. After majoring in LL.M in Sacramento, he became a member of the New York State Bar Association. In 1999, he went on to work as a lawyer in the private sector until 2002.

In 2002, he was appointed to advise the Minister of Economic Development before becoming president of the Azerbaijan Export and Investment Promotion Foundation (AZPROMO) in 2003-2004.

On 20 February 2005, Mikayil Jabbarov was appointed Deputy Minister of Economic Development by the Decree of the President of the Republic of Azerbaijan.

As deputy minister, he was responsible for coordination of activities related to cooperation with international financial institutions and external economic relations, foreign investment policy, legal issues at international arbitrage and corporate governance.

In 2009 he was appointed Director of the Administration of the Icherisheher State Historical-Architectural Reserve by the Decree of the President of the Republic of Azerbaijan.

19 April 2013 – appointed Minister of Education by the decree of the President of the Republic of Azerbaijan.

16 June 2017 – appointed as co-chair of Azerbaijan-Israel Joint Commission by the decree of the President of the Republic of Azerbaijan.

5 December 2017 – appointed as Minister of Taxes by the decree of the President of the Republic of Azerbaijan.

17 March 2018 – 2 July 2022 - served as co-chair of the Intergovernmental Commission on Bilateral Cooperation between the government of the Republic of Azerbaijan and the government of the Republic of Lithuania by the Decree of the President of the Republic of Azerbaijan.

17 March 2018 – 2 March 2020 – served as co-chair of the Joint Commission to promote economic cooperation between the government of the Republic of Azerbaijan and the government of the Republic of Croatia.

10 October 2018 – promoted to the special rank of 3rd class State Tax Service Adviser by the decree of the President of the Republic of Azerbaijan.

9 February 2019 – promoted to the special rank of 2nd class State Tax Service Adviser by the decree of the President of the Republic of Azerbaijan.

23 October 2019 – appointed as Minister of Economy by the decree of the President of the Republic of Azerbaijan.

4 December 2019 – appointed as co-chair of the Joint Commission between the government of the Republic of Azerbaijan and the government of the United Arab Emirates on economic, trade and technical cooperation by the decree of the President of the Republic of Azerbaijan.

2 March 2020 – appointed as co-chair of the Joint Commission between the government of the Republic of Azerbaijan and the government of the Swiss Federal Council by the decree of the President of the Republic of Azerbaijan.

2 March 2020 – appointed as deputy co-chair of the Joint Intergovernmental Commission between the Republic of Azerbaijan and the Republic of Georgia on economic cooperation by the decree of the President of the Republic of Azerbaijan.

4 January 2021 – appointed as a member of the supervisory board of the «Karabakh Revival Fund» by the decree of the President of the Republic of Azerbaijan.

23 January 2021 – appointed as the chairman of the supervisory board of State Oil Company of the Republic of Azerbaijan by the decree of the President of the Republic of Azerbaijan.

7 July 2022 - appointed as co-chair of the Joint Intergovernmental Commission on cooperation between the Republic of Azerbaijan and the Republic of Uzbekistan.

Since July 28, 2022, he has been co-chair of the joint intergovernmental commission on economic and humanitarian cooperation between the Republic of Azerbaijan and Turkmenistan.

Social activity 

From an early age, Mikayil Jabbarov has been involved in various intellectual games, social activities and extracurricular activities.

From 1994 until 1997, he was president of the "Atashgakh" Intellectual Games Club. From 1996 to 1997 he was Vice-Chairman of the Azerbaijani Youth Organizations Forum.

In 1997, he won the CIS championship in the intellectual play "Brain ring". Later that year, Jabbarov became the first Azerbaijani player in the intellectual television game "What?Where? When?" held in Moscow, participated in the Final of the 1997 Summer Series. He was also a regular participant of the Baku TV club "What? Where? When?". Winner of the 5th Anniversary Club games.

In 2002, he became world champion of the intellectual game "Brain Ring" and champion of the national championship of "What? Where? When?".

For his contributions to strengthening socio-cultural links between Baku and Tbilisi, Mikayil Jabbarov was granted honorary citizenship in Tbilisi (Georgia) in 2009.

2015–2021 – President of the Azerbaijan Badminton Federation.

2017–2021 – President of the Azerbaijan Fencing Federation.

from 2021 – mentor of the winner of nationwide competition "Yüksəliş".

from 2021 – President of Azerbaijan Wrestling Federation.

Work at the Administration of Icherisheher Reserve 

Under the leadership of Mikayil Jabbarov during 2009–2013, the Administration of the State Historical-Architectural Reserve Icherisheher developed and implemented a comprehensive master plan for the conservation of the historical center of Baku, and a master development plan for Icherisheher.

In accordance with the plans, the conservation and restoration of historic and cultural monuments of national and international importance, such as the Small Caravanserai, the Mohammed Mosque, the religious and architectural complex Syratagly (Market Square) were carried out.

Most of the walls of the Baku fortress and the 15th tower, destroyed in the early twentieth century, have been restored. Restoration, conservation and research work were conducted on the Maiden Tower, included in the UNESCO's List of Cultural Heritage. An automated system has been introduced in order to regulate and minimize vehicle access to the reserve.

The successful management and restoration of key historical, cultural and architectural monuments led to the expansion of Mikayil Jabbarov's area of responsibility. The Baku Marionette Theatre was transferred to the Administration's control. The State Historical and Ethnographic Reserve Gala and the Historical and Architectural Museum Reserve Shirvanshahs’ Palace Complex were included in the Reserve. By presidential decree a house-museum of world-renowned artist Tahir Salahov was established in the Reserve area.

Mikayil Jabbarov also oversaw the development of the Administration's foreign relations. For instance, the Centre for Traditional Arts Icherisheher was established in cooperation with the Prince of Wales School of Traditional Arts (UK).

In general, Jabbarov's name is associated with initiatives to turn the Reserve into a center for domestic and foreign tourism and to increase the tourism services' level provided within the Reserve.

Mikayil Jabbarov also supervised and successfully implemented the process of excluding Icherisheher from UNESCO's List of World Heritage in Danger. The Administration of Icherisheher has become an example for other countries, whose UNESCO World Heritage sites are in danger.

Work at the Ministry of Education 

As Minister of Education, Mikayil Jabbarov made the digitalisation of the education sector a priority. He initiated several projects, such as automatic allocation of first-graders in general education schools, transfer of university students between faculties and between universities, etc. With Minister's support, a branch of the International Academy of Information Technologies "STEP IT" was opened in Azerbaijan at the Baku Vocational School No 9, the Big Data Research and Training Center was set up at ADA University with financial support from BP.

Another area of Jabbarov's activity was in increasing the availability and quality of pre-school and school education. Under his direction the Ministry of Education has automated the relevant processes; conducted a diagnostic evaluation of nearly 100,000 teachers in general schools in 2014–2017; adopted new rules guaranteeing the transparency of the subject Olympiads; guaranteed state-funded preschool education to provide a school readiness program for 5-year-olds.

At the initiative of the Minister and in order to protect the health of schoolchildren, improve learning conditions in the schools and develop horizontal relations between teachers, schoolchildren and parents, the "School Children's Friend" project was launched in close cooperation with the State Agency for Public Services and Social Innovations under the President of the Republic of Azerbaijan. At the same time, within the framework of the Ministry's project "Healthy Education - Healthy Nation" a complete renovation of 9 major school buildings was carried out, 106 new modular schools were built for 5,000 students in sparsely populated villages.

From 2013 to 2017, Azerbaijani schoolchildren won 109 medals at the international subject Olympiads, 3 in gold, 21 in silver and 85 in bronze. This accounts for more than one-third of the total medals won during the country's independence.

The country's position in international program designed to measure reading performance at the fourth year level (the PIRLS ranking) has improved considerably. In 2016, compared to the PIRLS-2011, the number of Azerbaijani schoolchildren included in the "excellent" category increased from 0% to 2%. The growth of 7% from 9% to 16% was recorded in the "good" category. In other words, in 5 years, the number of elementary school pupils, who belonged to these two categories, doubled. Meanwhile, the number of students in the "low" category declined by 10%, from 37% to 27%.

In the field of higher education, Minister Jabbarov pursued the path of creating SABAH groups in 34 specialties among the best students of higher education institutions. The purpose of SABAH groups is to improve the quality of higher education, to create a new educational environment and to offer training in line with the real demands of the labor market. The first SABAH students graduated in 2017.

The presence of higher education institutions with foreign participation has also expanded in the country. At the initiative of the Presidents of Azerbaijan and France, the French-Azerbaijani University UFAZ was created in 2014, followed by the Baku branch of the State Medical University of Moscow named after I.M.Sechenov.

At the initiative of the Minister, Azerbaijani higher education organizations have been given access to the Thomson Reuters Web of Science® - science citation index platform, Science Citation Index Expanded® (database of natural sciences), Social Sciences Citation Index® (database of social sciences), Arts and Humanities Citation Index®, Conference Proceedings Citation Index®, and Thomson Reuters:InCites™.

In addition to identifying talented young people, Mikayil Jabbarov saw a need for students to take an active part in the socio-political life of the country. On December 14, 2015, the 1st Forum of Azerbaijani Student Volunteers was held in Baku. The same year, the student-volunteer program "Bir" (meaning “One”) was established under the Ministry of Education.

When the 2nd Student Volunteer Forum was held in December 2016, the program involved more than 7,000 young people from 17 universities across the country. They participated in 63 events of different kind, including the Formula One Grand Prix in Baku.

Between 2013 and 2018 Mikayil Jabbarov held meetings with ASAN volunteers within the framework of the Innovative Governance project, with participants of the Young Leaders Program "We Learn Heydar Aliyev political school", with Azerbaijani youth in Moscow and Ankara, as well as with participants of state program on education of students abroad.

Work at the Ministry of Taxes 

At the conference on "Taxes. Transparency. Development." held in Baku in 2018, Mikayil Jabbarov named his primary objectives as the Minister of Taxes, which were: ensuring the transparency of the Ministry's activities, simplifying export procedures, accessibility of the Ministry's services to citizens of the country, mutual trust between taxpayers and tax authorities, as well as effective oversight of tax revenues.

Minister regularly discussed these objectives, steps to achieve them, as well as information on tax reforms and changes in legislation during meetings with representatives of the diplomatic corps of foreign states, accredited in Azerbaijan, local and foreign business representatives.

The first steps to achieve the objectives stated by the Minister were installation of excise posts at tobacco and alcohol producing enterprises; execution of the twinning program "Support to the Ministry of Taxes in transfer pricing and developing anti-tax avoidance measures"; introduction of online cash registers; implementation of a single procedure for legal entity registration in 20 minutes; number of initiatives to improve transparency in various sectors of the economy, and many more.

To support these and further reforms, Mikayil Jabbarov initiated structural changes in the Ministry, as well as changes to the Tax Code. The amendments to the Tax Code were approved by two Presidential decrees and covered 5 main areas: support for entrepreneurship, combating the shadow economy and tax evasion, expanding the tax base, improving tax administration, and increasing the efficiency of tax incentives. The proposed Tax Ombudsman position was also approved.

As a result of the above measures in 2017–2019, there has been a sharp increase in tax revenues for non-oil industries, revenue transparency and the legalization of the labor market.

In 2019, a strong increase was recorded in the share of turnover on electronic invoices, which served as an indicator of growing transparency in business and the shrinking of the shadow economy.

Work at the Ministry of Economy 

As Minister of Economy, Mikayil Jabbarov attaches great importance to the "whitening" of the economy, encourages the introduction of modern technologies. In May 2020, a VAT refund mechanism for non-cash and cash payments (“ƏDV geri al”) had been introduced, which was recognized as the "Innovative Project of the Year". The Ministry of Economy of Azerbaijan and the Ministry of Economic Development of Russia signed a protocol of intent on cooperation in the field of innovative development and digital economy. A memorandum of understanding was signed in the field of digital trade between Azerbaijan and Turkey. On February 24, 2022, with the participation of Mikayil Jabbarov and the President of the World Economic Forum Børge Brende, the Azerbaijan center of the Fourth Industrial Revolution (4IR) Network of the World Economic Forum was inaugurated.

At the initiative of the Ministry of Economy, comprehensive measures are being implemented aimed at increasing the interest of young people in the field of entrepreneurship. In 2019, the First Forum of Young Entrepreneurs was held in Baku, with the Second Forum taking place in 2021.

One of the priority areas of economic reforms in Azerbaijan is the formation of small and medium-sized businesses as the main driving force of the economy. In order to simplify the access of entrepreneurs to its services, the Agency for the Development of Small and Medium Businesses launched specialized "Houses of Small and Medium Businesses". The Ministry of Economy stimulates entrepreneurship by expanding and simplifying concessional lending at the expense of the Entrepreneurship Development Fund, for which it started an Electronic Loan Platform in 2020.

As part of the development of local industry, a pharmaceutical plant in the Pirallahi Industrial Park and a plant for the production of thermal insulation boards in the Hajigabul Industrial Park were opened, and a memorandum of understanding was signed between the Ministry and “Azerbaijan Coca-Cola Bottlers” LLC on the construction of a new plant. On September 24, 2020, in connection with the issue of bonds, AzerGold CJSC held a “ring a bell” ceremony.

The activities of industrial parks have expanded significantly. In 2021, residents of the Sumgait Chemical Industrial Park produced products worth 2.2 billion manats, while since the start of operation in 2011 until 2021 (including 2021), this figure equaled 4.7 billion manats. Exports of products manufactured in the industrial park exceeded 764 million manats in 2021 only, almost the same amount of products were exported for the entire period of 2011–2020.

In 2021, the share of the country's industrial parks in terms of investments in the non-oil sector reached 23.8%, more than 3,200 new jobs were created.

In continuation of work aimed at expansion of the industrial potential of the territories occupied from the Armenian population, the “Araz Valley Economic Zone” Industrial Park in Jabrail district and the “Aghdam Industrial Park” are being created.

In 2020, Azerbaijan approved an action plan to reduce the negative impact of the coronavirus pandemic and to compensate for the damage caused by the pandemic to businesses. The President of the Republic of Azerbaijan signed a law on the introduction of a special tax regime for the period of the pandemic and a decree on measures to control compliance with the requirements of quarantine regimes, the implementation of which was entrusted to the Ministry of Economy.

Azerbaijan's foreign economic relations are expanding. Mikayil Jabbarov took part in the opening of the Trade and Tourism Representative Offices of Azerbaijan in Israel, and the Ukraine's Trading House in Baku.  With the participation of the minister, a number of intergovernmental and business agreements were signed: an action plan of the Joint Intergovernmental Commission between Azerbaijan and Turkey, a Framework Document on Sustainable Development Cooperation between Azerbaijan and the UN, a memorandum on technical support for the corporate sector development between Azerbaijan and the European Bank for Reconstruction and Development.

On November 20, 2019, Mikayil Jabbarov was elected as chairman of the Coordinating Council of Heads of Tax Services of the CIS States.

At the same time, the expansion of Azerbaijan's investment activities in other countries continues. Thus, a subsidiary of the State Oil Company of Azerbaijan Republic SOCAR Türkiye was ranked 8th in the list of "2021 Export Champions" published by the Turkish Exporters' Assembly. SOCAR Türkiye's subsidiary, Petkim, was ranked 22nd in the Top 1,000 Exporters list. At the event dedicated to this occasion, Turkish President Recep Tayyip Erdogan presented SOCAR Türkiye's award to Mikayil Jabbarov, the Chairman of the supervisory board of the company.

After the victory of Azerbaijan in the Second Karabakh War in 2020, the government began to implement activities, such as the restoration of the liberated territories, as well as the presentation of the economic potential of these territories in the international arena. For the first time the economic and investment potential of the liberated territories were demonstrated at the international exhibition in Istanbul. Financial sanctions are lifted in relation to micro-and small businesses from the previously fully and/or partially occupied regions, as well as frontline territories.

Among the heroes of the Second Karabakh War are 146 employees of the Ministry of Economy, who the Minister holds regular meetings with.

In accordance with the order of Azerbaijani President Ilham Aliyev, the "Socio-economic development strategy for 2022-2026 of the Republic of Azerbaijan" has been approved. Commenting on the significance of the document, Minister of Economy Mikayil Jabbarov noted that the working groups created during the preparation of the document were led by the heads of the relevant fields and ministries: "Our main goals are the welfare of the society, integration of Azerbaijan's economy into the global value chain, as well as the intensification of innovative orientation and financial stability of the national economy.”

The Ministry of Science and Education and the Ministry of Economy of Azerbaijan have launched the project entitled the "IT-Academy". Minister of Economy Mikayil Jabbarov said that the goal of the IT Academy is to train professionals in the field of information technology, facilitate the development of the country's IT market, as well as accelerate digitalization in the education system.

24 December 2022 – Minister of Economy Mikayil Jabbarov appointed as co-chair of the Joint Intergovernmental Commission on trade-economic, scientific-technical and cultural cooperation between the Republic of Azerbaijan and the Republic of Tatarstan of the Russian Federation.

Controversies 

2013–2017 – Comprehensive measures were taken to prevent bribery and corruption in the educational system, but they were not assessed as fully successful. Experts called for more radical measures to be taken, no real proposals were put forward though.

2016 – The idea that "it is not right to assess the students studying within a new educational system through the tests" was met with criticism. This idea was misrepresented to the public as a suggestion to cancel the test exams, while, in fact, the  idea implied application of new tools to assess students’ knowledge. With this regard, the State Examination Center released a statement with a similar message, confirming that the new idea does not mean a cancellation of the tests as such.

See also 
Cabinet of Azerbaijan
Education in Azerbaijan

Social networks

References 

1976 births
Living people
Government ministers of Azerbaijan
Baku State University alumni
Azerbaijan State University of Economics alumni
University of the Pacific (United States) alumni
Politicians from Baku